Cyclic AMP-responsive element-binding protein 3 is a protein that in humans is encoded by the CREB3 gene.

This gene encodes a transcription factor that is a member of the leucine zipper family of DNA binding proteins. This protein binds to the cAMP-responsive element, an octameric palindrome. The protein interacts with host cell factor C1, which also associates with the herpes simplex virus (HSV) protein VP16 that induces transcription of HSV immediate-early genes. This protein and VP16 both bind to the same site on host cell factor C1. It is thought that the interaction between this protein and host cell factor C1 plays a role in the establishment of latency during HSV infection. An additional transcript variant has been identified, but its biological validity has not been determined.

See also
 CREB

Interactions
CREB3 has been shown to interact with Host cell factor C1.

References

Further reading

External links 
 
 

Transcription factors